Clube Ferroviário de Nacala Velha is a Mozambican football club.

Stadium
The club plays their home matches at Campo de Bella Vista, which has a maximum capacity of 5,000 people.

Achievements
Moçambola: 0

Cup of Mozambique: 0

 Supertaça de Moçambique: 1
 2015.

Performance in CAF competitions
 African Cup of Champions Clubs: 1 appearance
1987: Preliminary Round

CAF Cup Winners' Cup: 8 appearances

1979 – First Round
1983 – First Round
1988 – First Round

1991 – First Round
1995 – Semi-Finals
1997 – First Round

CAF Cup: 2 appearances
1998 – First Round
2003 – First Round

Performance in African competitions
CAF Champions League: 2 appearances
Best: 2003–04 Preliminary Round – Lost against AmaZulu 7 – 4 on aggregate

Current squad

References

External links
 Clube Ferroviário de Nacala
 Club profile at GlobalSportArchive
 Club profile at Soccerway

F
Association football clubs established in 1973
1973 establishments in Mozambique
Sport in Maputo